Tang Chen is a Hong Kong actress. She was active primarily in the 1950s and 1960s.

Filmography
Blossoms in the Heart (1952)
The Golden World (1953)
The Beauty and the Dumb (1954)
The Chase (1956)
Love Fiesta (1957)
Air Hostess (1959)
Lady on the Roof (1959)
A Shot in the Dark (1960)

External links

Tang Chen at HKMDB

Hong Kong film actresses
Possibly living people
Year of birth missing